The 1904 Ohio Medical football team was an American football team that represented the Ohio Medical College in the 1904 college football season.

Schedule

References

Ohio Medical
Ohio Medical football seasons
Ohio Medical football